The 2004 European Karate Championships, the 39th edition, were held in Moscow, Russia from 7 to 9 May 2004.

Medallists

Men's competition

Individual

Team

Women's competition

Individual

Team

Medagliere

References

External links
 Karate Records – European Championship 2004

2004
International sports competitions hosted by Russia
European Karate Championships
European championships in 2004
Sports competitions in Moscow
2004 in Moscow
Karate competitions in Russia
May 2004 sports events in Europe